(89830) 2002 CE, provisional designation , is a stony asteroid, classified as near-Earth object and potentially hazardous asteroid of the Amor group, approximately 3.1 kilometers in diameter. It was discovered on 1 February 2002, by astronomers of the LINEAR program at Lincoln Laboratory's Experimental Test Site near Socorro, New Mexico, in the United States. This asteroid is one of the largest potentially hazardous asteroid known to exist.

Orbit and classification 

 is a member of the dynamical Amor group, which are Mars-crossing asteroids that approach the orbit of Earth from beyond, but do not cross it.

It orbits the Sun at a distance of 1.0–3.1 AU once every 2 years and 12 months (1,094 days; semi-major axis of 2.08 AU). Its orbit has a high eccentricity of 0.51 and an inclination of 44° with respect to the ecliptic.

The body's observation arc begins with a precovery from the Digitized Sky Survey taken at the Siding Spring Observatory, Australia, in May 1982, nearly 20 years prior to its official discovery observation at Socorro.

Close approaches 

With an absolute magnitude of 14.9,  is one of the brightest and largest known potentially hazardous asteroid (see PHA-list).

Physical characteristics 

 has been characterized as a common, stony S-type asteroid by astronomers conducting spectroscopic observations using the New Technology Telescope at La Silla, Chile, and the 2.2-meter telescope of the Calar Alto Observatory in Spain.

Rotation period 

Lightcurve analysis gave a rotation period of 2.6149 hours with a low brightness amplitude of 0.09 magnitude. Several longer periods are also possible.

Diameter and albedo 

According to the survey carried out by the NEOWISE mission of NASA's Wide-field Infrared Survey Explorer,  measures 5.067 kilometers in diameter and its surface has a low albedo of 0.079. Conversely, the Collaborative Asteroid Lightcurve Link assumes a stony standard albedo of 0.20 and calculates a smaller diameter of 3.11 kilometers based on an absolute magnitude of 14.9.

Numbering and naming 

This minor planet was numbered by the Minor Planet Center on 30 August 2004. As of 2018, it has not been named.

Notes

References

External links 
 Asteroid Lightcurve Database (LCDB), query form (info )
 Dictionary of Minor Planet Names, Google books
 Asteroids and comets rotation curves, CdR – Observatoire de Genève, Raoul Behrend
 
 
 

089830
089830
089830
20020201